Taj Khatun (also Romanized as Tāj Khātūn and Taj Khatoon; also known as Tāsh Khātūn) is a village in Hajjilar-e Shomali Rural District, Hajjilar District, Chaypareh County, West Azerbaijan Province, Iran. At the 2006 census, its population was 382, in 77 families.

References 

Populated places in Chaypareh County